First Capital Bank Botswana Limited, formerly known as Capital Bank, is a commercial bank in Botswana, licensed by the Bank of Botswana, the central bank and national banking regulator. It is a subsidiary of FMBCapital Holdings Plc, a Mauritius-based financial services conglomerate, whose shares of stock are listed on the Malawi Stock Exchange and has subsidiaries in Botswana, Malawi, Mozambique, Zambia and Zimbabwe.

Location
The headquarters and main branch of the bank are located at First Capital House, 2nd Commercial Road, in Gaborone, the capital and largest city in Botswana. The geographical coordinates of the bank's headquarters are: 24°38'56.0"S, 25°54'14.0"E (Latitude:-24.648889; Longitude:25.903889).

Overview
As of December 2018, the bank had total assets of BWP:2,880,502,881 (US$241 million), with shareholders' equity of BWP:196,059,009 (US$16.5 million).

History
The bank began operations in 2008, following the issuance of its banking license by the Bank of Botswana, the national banking regulator. Capital Bank introduced Internet banking in 2009 and Visa Debit Cards in 2010. In 2019, the bank successfully acquired the assets and liabilities of the now former Bank of India (Botswana) Limited, another commercial bank.

Ownership
As of December 2021, the major shareholders of First Capital Bank Botswana, were as laid out in the table below:

Branches
As of April 2020, First Capital Bank Botswana maintains its headquarters at First Capital House, Plot. 74768, 2nd Commercial Road, New CBD, Gaborone, Botswana. The networked branches of the bank are located at the following locations.

 Main Branch: Capital House, Plot. 17954, Old Lobatse Road, Gaborone
 Mogoditshane Branch: Plot. 4216, Supa Save Complex, Along Molepolole Road, Mogoditshane
 Broadhurst Branch: First Capital House, Plot. 74768, 2nd Commercial Road, New CBD, Gaborone
 Francistown Branch: Plot. 448, Blue Jacket Street, Francistown.
 Maun Branch: Plot 17396 Nkwe road Maun industrial area

Governance
The chairman of the six-person board of directors is Hitesh Anadkat. The chief executive officer of the bank, since January 2021, is Reinette van der Merwe.

See also

 List of banks in Botswana
 Economy of Botswana
 List of companies of Botswana

References

External links
 Official Website

Banks of Botswana
Gaborone
Banks established in 2008
2008 establishments in Botswana
FMBCapital Holdings Plc